Chris Gayne is a Scottish BAFTA nominated sound designer, who studied at the Edinburgh College of Art. He is possibly best known for his work on the short film Anna which earned him a nomination for the best sound accolade at the  2015 British Academy Scotland New Talent Awards. He also worked on the film Tide which received a nomination in the best actor category at the same ceremony.

Filmography

Awards and nominations

References

External links

Official Chris Gayne Website

British sound designers
Alumni of the Edinburgh College of Art
British audio engineers
Film people from Glasgow
Living people
Year of birth missing (living people)